The 19th Asian Junior and Cadet Table Tennis Championships 2013 were held in Doha, Qatar, from  30 August to 3 September 2013. It was organised by the Qatar Table Tennis Association under the authority of the Asian Table Tennis Union (ATTU).

Medal summary

Events

Medal table

See also

2013 World Junior Table Tennis Championships
Asian Table Tennis Championships
Asian Table Tennis Union

References

Asian Junior and Cadet Table Tennis Championships
Asian Junior and Cadet Table Tennis Championships
Asian Junior and Cadet Table Tennis Championships
Asian Junior and Cadet Table Tennis Championships
Table tennis competitions in Qatar
International sports competitions hosted by Qatar
Asian Junior and Cadet Table Tennis Championships
Asian Junior and Cadet Table Tennis Championships